Mikl may refer to:

Mikl.-Maclay or Nicholas Miklouho-Maclay (1846–1888), Russian explorer, ethnologist, anthropologist and biologist
Josef Mikl (1929–2008), Austrian abstract painter of the Informal style
Mikl, a musician in the band Brokencyde
Johanna Mikl-Leitner (born 1964), Austrian politician of the ÖVP
Jon Mikl Thor (born 1953), bodybuilding champion, actor, songwriter, screenwriter, historian, vocalist and musician

See also

Meikle (disambiguation)
Meikles
Mickel
Mickle
Mihkel
Mikal (disambiguation)
Mikel
Mikkel